Ashley Johnson (born 16 May 1986) is a professional rugby union player-coach who plays and coaches for Birmingham Moseley in National League 1. He previously played for Free State Cheetahs at provincial level, Cheetahs in the Super Rugby, Wasps in Premiership Rugby and the Springboks. His usual position is hooker, having converted from backrow whilst with Wasps. His first game for the Springboks was in 2009 on tour to the British Isles, but he only earned his first Test Caps in the 2011 Tri-Nations series.

Career
Ashley Johnson is the son of Archie Johnson, who played Tight-Head Prop for the Western Province League and the SA Federation team (SA Proteas) in the 80s. Ashley followed in his father's footsteps and started out in the Prop position at school level, before moving to the no8 position.

At an early age Ashley was scouted and received a Nike Bursary, from where he continued his schooling at Paarl Gim. He eventually captained the Paarl Gim 1st team. and a Western Province schools team.

In 2006 Ashley joined the Free State Cheetahs. Between 2008 and 2009 he was loaned to the Griffons Rugby team for short stints, as Free State Cheetahs coach Naka Drotské planned to give Ashley more game time. It was also during this time that Naka Drotské experimented by playing Ashley at Hooker (No. 2) position, but due to injury problems in the loose forwards Ashley Johnson was recalled and had his first true chance to shine at No.8 where he excelled.  This earned him his first call-up for the Springboks (South African International Rugby Union Team) in the November 2009 tour to the British Isles.

On 11 April 2012, Johnson signed for English side Wasps in the Aviva Premiership for the 2012/13 season.

On 20 April 2018 it was revealed that Johnson had tested positive for a "prohibited substance" in an out of competition drugs test on 7 February 2018 and was suspended until further notice. It was later revealed that hydrochlorothiazide was found in his urine — according to Johnson this was due to consuming his wife's dietary supplement — and the RFU ruled that this was due to carelessness, imposing a six-month ban on Johnson, allowing him to return to rugby duties on 7 August 2018.

He departed Wasps in June 2020 to become a player-coach at Birmingham Moseley.

Squads
Ashley Johnson participated in the following Rugby Union squads:
2012 Wasps – Aviva Premiership
2011
 Cheetahs – Super Rugby
 Free State Cheetahs – Currie Cup Premier Division
 Springboks – Tri-Nations
2010
 Cheetahs – Super 14
 Free State Cheetahs – Vodacom Cup
 Free State Cheetahs – Currie Cup Premier Division
2009
 Free State Cheetahs – Vodacom Cup
 Griffons – Currie Cup First Division
 Free State Cheetahs – Currie Cup Premier Division
 Springboks – International Outgoing Tour
2008
 Free State Cheetahs – Vodacom Cup
 Griffons – Currie Cup First Division
 Free State Cheetahs – Currie Cup Premier Division
 Emerging Springboks – IRB Nations Cup
2007
 Free State Cheetahs U21
 Free State Cheetahs – Vodacom Cup
 Free State Cheetahs – Currie Cup Premier Division
2006
 Free State Cheetahs U21
 Free State Cheetahs Sevens
 South Africa – U21 World Championship
2004
 Western Province – U18 Coca-Cola Craven Week
2003
 Western Province – U18 Academy
 South Africa U18
2002
 Western Province (Captain)
2001
 Boland, Stomers & Nike (Captain) U15
1999
 Western Province – Craven Week
1998
 Western Province – Nike U12 & U13 Craven Week

References

External links 

South African rugby union players
South Africa international rugby union players
Living people
1986 births
Cheetahs (rugby union) players
Free State Cheetahs players
People from the Western Cape
Rugby union flankers
Rugby union number eights
Doping cases in rugby union
Rugby union players from Cape Town
Wasps RFC players